Butterfly is the twelfth album by the Japanese rock band L'Arc-en-Ciel. It was released on February 8, 2012, in two versions: regular and limited editions, with the latter including the first album by their alter ego band P'unk-en-Ciel, titled P'unk Is Not Dead, and a DVD. The album is also set to be released in several European countries, starting on March 5, 2012, with the United Kingdom and finishing on March 17 with Spain and Poland.

The band's first studio album in four years, it includes all six singles (including one double A-side single) released between "Drink It Down" in 2008 and "Chase" in 2011. Butterfly debuted at #1 on the Oricon chart, selling over 170,000 copies in its first week. On Gaon Music Chart, it debuted at #8.

Butterfly track listing

P'unk Is Not Dead track listing

Personnel
Butterfly
 hyde – vocals, keyboards on tracks 1, 2 and 5
 ken – guitar, backing vocals, keyboards on tracks 1, 6-8 and 11, tambourine on track 3, vibes on track 5
 tetsuya – bass guitar, backing vocals, keyboards on tracks 3, 4, 9 and 10
 yukihiro – drums, keyboards on tracks 6 and 7, tambourine on 8, grancassa on track 11
 Rie Eto – backing vocals on track 1
 Akira Nishihara – keyboards on tracks 2, 4, 9 and 10
 Hajime Okano – keyboards on track 3, 5, 9 and 10, Q-chord on track 4
 Chieko Kanehara – strings on tracks 2, 4 and 5
 Shiro Sasaki, Teppei Kawakami – trumpet on track 4
 Kanade Shishiuchi – trombone on track 4
 Masato Honda – alto saxophone on track 4
 Takayuki Mogami – oboe on track 5
 Hikoutsu Fujita, Shingi Takahashi – horn on track 5
 Yuji Sugiyama – keyboards on track 7
 Takashi Kusama – keyboards on track 10

P'unk is Not Dead
 T.E.Z P'UNK – vocals
 HYDE P'UNK – guitar
 YUKI P'UNK – bass guitar
 KEN P'UNK – drums

References

L'Arc-en-Ciel albums
2012 albums